Rosetta Sahanna (born 12 February 1960) is an Australian politician. She has been an Australian Labor Party member of the Western Australian Legislative Council since 2021, representing Mining and Pastoral region.

She was elected to the Legislative Council at the 2021 state election. A Wilinggin woman, she is the first Aboriginal person elected to the state's upper house. She is a member of the board of the Kimberley Land Council.

References

1960 births
Living people
Members of the Western Australian Legislative Council
Place of birth missing (living people)
Australian Labor Party members of the Parliament of Western Australia
Indigenous Australian politicians
Women members of the Western Australian Legislative Council
21st-century Australian politicians
21st-century Australian women politicians